Sam Sharpe Teachers’ College (formerly Granville Teachers’ College) is a college located in Saint James, Jamaica.

The Inception of SSTC
Sam Sharpe Teacher's College was established in September 1975 from funding received from the World Bank and the Government of Jamaica. Initially, this institution was called Granville Teachers’ College, a named derived from its proximity to the Granville community in Saint James. This institution was created as a vehicle to provide opportunities for personal development and high quality training of Teachers, as well as the people in and around the western region of Jamaica. Sam Sharpe Teachers College also provided programmes outside of the teacher training curriculum to the constituents of neighbouring communities.

Name change and Motto
In October 1975 the then Granville Teachers’ College, was renamed Sam Sharpe Teachers’ College as a tribute to one of Jamaica's National Hero, Samuel Sharpe. Sam Sharpe as he was affectionately called, was named a National Hero in Jamaica earlier that same year. The institution was inspired to coined its motto Service, Commitment, Excellence from the philosophy and life example of Sam Sharpe who was a slave and Baptist Deacon.

Programmes Available at SSTC

BACHELOR OF EDUCATION
 B.Ed. In Early Childhood Education (Full And Part-Time)
 B.Ed. In Primary Education (Full And Part-Time)
 B.Ed. In Special Education
 B.Ed. In School Counselling

SECONDARY EDUCATION
 B.Ed. In English Language And Literature
 B.Ed. In Spanish / English Language
 B.Ed. In Spanish / French
 B.Ed. In Biology And Mathematics / Biology / Mathematics

ASSOCIATE DEGREE
 Associate Degree in teaching with concentration in skill areas

Partnership Programmes

Caribbean Maritime University 
 Bachelor of Engineering in Industrial Systems
 Bachelor of Science in Logistics and Supply Chain

Sam Sharpe Diagnostic and Early Intervention Centre 
 This Diagnostic Centre will identify and facilitate children with learning and other developmental exceptionalities, as well as provide counselling support for parents.

PRE COLLEGE COURSES
 English Language / English Literature
 Spanish
 Mathematics
 Human & Social Biology
 Biology
 Physics 
 Chemistry
 Social Studies

Notable alumni
 Damion Warren, known professionally as Teacha Dee, Jamaican International reggae singer, producer and educator

References

Colleges in Jamaica
1975 establishments in North America
Educational institutions established in 1975